Thomas Edward Draper (born November 20, 1966) is a Canadian former professional ice hockey goaltender.  He was chosen in the eighth round, 165th overall, the 8th pick of the Winnipeg Jets in the 1985 NHL Entry Draft.

Playing career
Draper was born in Outremont, Quebec. As a youth, he played in the 1978 and 1979 Quebec International Pee-Wee Hockey Tournament with a minor ice hockey team from Verdun, Quebec. 

Draper played collegiately at the University of Vermont and, after college, played one season in Finland with Tappara of the SM-liiga.  He made his North American professional debut with the AHL's Moncton Hawks in the 1988–89 season, and also appeared in two NHL games with the Winnipeg Jets that same season.

On February 28, 1991, the Jets traded Draper to the St. Louis Blues for future considerations, which on May 24, 1991 turned out to be for Jim Vesey; Draper was ultimately traded back to the Jets.  On June 22, 1991 the Buffalo Sabres acquired him from the Jets for the seventh round draft pick in the 1992 entry draft.  On September 30, 1993 the Sabres traded Draper to the New York Islanders for a seventh round draft pick, Steve Plouffe in the 1994 entry draft.  He then became a free agent and the Winnipeg Jets picked him up again on December 14, 1995.

In his NHL career, Draper played with the Jets, Buffalo Sabres, and New York Islanders. He ended up playing 53 professional games in the NHL. He also spent several seasons in both the AHL and the IHL.  In the 1998–99 AHL season, with the Rochester Americans, Draper shared the Hap Holmes Memorial Award (lowest team goals against average) with teammate Martin Biron. Draper had a career goals against average of 3.70 and 19 wins in the NHL.  After his NHL career Draper went back to Finland and became a top netminder playing for the Espoo Blues and Lukko Rauma, gaining a record of 27-17-7.

Career statistics

Regular season and playoffs

Awards and honors

 Hap Holmes Memorial Award (lowest GAA in AHL): 1998–99
  In the 1985–86 and the 1986-87 seasons Draper was named to East Coast Athletic Conference All-Star First Team.
  AHL Second All-Star Team, 1988-1989

References

External links
 

1966 births
Living people
Adirondack IceHawks players
Anglophone Quebec people
Augusta Lynx players
Buffalo Sabres players
Canadian expatriate ice hockey players in Finland
Canadian expatriate ice hockey players in the United States
Canadian ice hockey goaltenders
Cleveland Lumberjacks players
Espoo Blues players
HIFK (ice hockey) players
Ice hockey people from Montreal
Long Beach Ice Dogs (IHL) players
Lukko players
Milwaukee Admirals (IHL) players
Minnesota Moose players
Moncton Hawks players
New York Islanders players
People from Outremont, Quebec
Peoria Rivermen (IHL) players
Quebec Rafales players
Rochester Americans players
Salt Lake Golden Eagles (IHL) players
Tappara players
Toledo Storm players
Vermont Catamounts men's ice hockey players
Winnipeg Jets (1979–1996) draft picks
Winnipeg Jets (1979–1996) players